Bishopstown Hurling and Football Club is a Cork-based Gaelic Athletic Association club based in the Bishopstown area of Cork city, Republic of Ireland. The club was founded in 1957.

Honours

Hurling
 Cork Senior Hurling Championship Runners-Up 2012
 Cork Minor Hurling Championship Winners (2) 2003, 2004  Runners-up 2006
 Cork Minor A Hurling Championship Runners-Up 2000
 Cork Premier Intermediate Hurling Championship (1) 2006
 Munster Intermediate Club Hurling Championship Runners-Up 2006
 Cork Intermediate Hurling Championship Winners (1) 1992
 Cork Under-21 Hurling Championship Winners (2) 2006 and 2007
 Cork City Junior A Hurling Championship Winners (1) 1977  | Runners-Up 1961, 1973
 Féile na nGael Division 1 Runners-Up 1988

Football
 Cork Senior Football Championship Runners-up to Nemo Rangers in 2002 and Carbery in 2004
 Cork Intermediate Football Championship Winners (1) 1974
 Cork Minor Football Championship Winners (3) 1992, 1993, 2000
 Cork Under-21 Football Championship Winners (1) 1992 | Runners-Up 1987, 1997
 City Junior Football Championship Winners (2) 1971, 1992 | Runners-Up 1968, 1991, 1993

Camogie
 Cork Senior Camogie Champions 1997, 1998, 1999, 2000

Notable players
 Barry Coffey
 Pa Cronin - former captain of the Cork Senior Hurling team
 Johnny Crowley
 John Crowley Kerry player
 Brian Cuthbert
 Paul McGrath
 Ken O'Halloran 
 Shane O'Neill 
 Jamie O'Sullivan
 John Egan - Irish Professinal Soccer Player

References

External links
Bishopstown GAA site

Gaelic games clubs in County Cork
Hurling clubs in County Cork
Gaelic football clubs in County Cork